Allergan plc is an American, Irish-domiciled pharmaceutical company that acquires, develops, manufactures and markets brand name drugs and medical devices in the areas of medical aesthetics, eye care, central nervous system, and gastroenterology. The company is the maker of Botox.

Allergan plc was formed in March 2015 when Irish–registered Actavis plc acquired U.S.–registered Allergan, Inc., and assumed the Allergan name.

In 2016, Allergan sold its generic business, Actavis, to Teva Pharmaceuticals for $40.5 billion.

In June 2019, U.S. pharmaceutical company AbbVie announced it had reached an agreement to acquire Allergan for $63 billion. The merged company would be domiciled in the U.S. for tax purposes.

Global headquarters
Allergan’s global headquarters are located in Dublin, Ireland. The company also maintains a significant presence in the United States, with administrative and operational headquarters located in various locations across the country, including Irvine, California and Madison, New Jersey.

History

Allergan plc was created from the 2015 merger and Irish corporate tax inversion of two companies, Irish-based Actavis plc and U.S.-based Allergan, Inc.

Allergan, Inc. 

In 1948, pharmacist Gavin S. Herbert founded Allergan Pharmaceuticals, Inc. In 1970, Allergan, Inc. became a public company via an initial public offering. In 1977, Allergan announced plans to build a factory in Westport, Ireland.

In 1980, it was acquired by SmithKline Corporation for $259 million and was later spun-off by SmithKline Beecham in 1989. In 1989, Allergan opened a manufacturing plant in Waco, Texas to manufacture eye care products.

In 1991, Allergan acquired the company Oculinum which manufactured products for eye muscle disorders. Following the acquisition, the product was renamed Botox. In 1996, Allergan received FDA approval for Alphagan ophthalmic solution for open-angle glaucoma and ocular hypertension. In 1998, Allergan established The Allergan Foundation, a private US-based charitable foundation.

In 2005, Allergan acquired Inamed which had a licensing agreement with Corneal Group Laboratoires for Juvederm products. In 2006, Allergan gained rights to Juvederm products.

Actavis plc 
In the spring of 1983, colleagues Allen Chao and David Hsia formed Watson Pharmaceuticals, a drug development in Libertyville, Illinois. In late fall of 1983, the company moved to Corona, California and began to develop and manufacture generic pharmaceuticals. In February 1993, the company became a public company via an initial public offering.

In 2011, the company moved its corporate headquarters from Corona, California to Parsippany-Troy Hills, New Jersey. In 2013, Actavis acquired Irish–registered Warner Chilcott for $5 billion and used the transaction to execute a corporate tax inversion to Ireland. In 2014, Actavis acquired Forest Laboratories for $25 billion.

Acquisition by Actavis plc (2015–2019)

In 2015, Irish–based Actavis plc acquired U.S.–based Allergan, Inc. for $70 billion, and in effect redomiciled Allergan to Ireland in a corporate tax inversion. Actavis CEO Brent Saunders became the CEO of the combined company. In June 2015, the company took the Allergan name. At the time, over 85% of the combined sales of the post-merger Allergan plc were from the U.S. healthcare system.

As of 2020, the company operated four facilities in Ireland.

2015

On July 7, 2015, the company acquired the rights to the late stage CGRP migraine portfolio of Merck & Co, as well as two experimental drugs for an upfront payment of $250 million. Later that summer, the company acquired Oculeve for $125 million and Naurex for an upfront payment of $560 million. In October 2015, the company acquired AqueSys, developer of ocular implants for an initial payment of $300 million, along with Kythera Biopharmaceuticals, a company focused on the medical aesthetics market, for $2.1 billion.

In late 2015, the company announced the acquisition of Northwood Medical Innovation, the developer of earFold. On November 25, 2015, the company announced it would partner with Rugen Therapeutic to develop new therapies for autism spectrum disorder and obsessive compulsive disorder.

Abandon Merger with Pfizer 
On November 23, 2015, Allergan and Pfizer announced their intention to merge in a $160 billion transaction. On April 5, 2016, after the Obama administration announced its plan to ban tax inversions, Pfizer terminated the acquisition and paid Allergan a $150 million breakup fee.

2016
In April 2016, the company announced it would partner with Heptares Therapeutics to develop a subtype-selective muscarinic agonists for Alzheimer's disease and announced the acquisition of Topokine Therapeutics, gaining the phase IIb/III compound XAF5 - a treatment for dermatochalasis.

In August 2016, Allergan plc sold its generic drugs business to Teva Pharmaceutical Industries in a $40.5 billion deal and announced the acquisition of ForSight VISION5 for more than $95 million.

In September 2016, CEO Saunders announced what he called a social contract to limit prices on the company's medications. That same month, the company acquired RetroSense Therapeutics for more than $60 million, announced the acquisition of Tobira Therapeutics for approximately $1.7 billion and, a day later, the acquisition of Akarna Therapeutics for $50 million.

In October 2016, the company sold Anda, its generic drug distribution business, to Teva for $500 million and acquired Vitae Pharmaceuticals, focused on dermatology treatments, for $639 million. That same month, the company announced it would acquire Motus Therapeutics, a developer of treatments for gastrointestinal disorders, for $200 million. On November 22, 2016, the company acquired Chase Pharmaceuticals for $125 million.

2017-2020
In 2017, the company acquired LifeCell, a specialist in regenerative medicine, for $2.9 billion and Zeltique Aesthetics, maker of CoolSculpting, for $2.4 billion. On June 7, the company announced the acquisition of Keller Medical, a company that manufactures devices for use during breast augmentation surgery. On December 12, the company announced the acquisition of Repros Therapeutics, a developer of drugs for reproductive system diseases.

In September 2018, Allergan acquired the aesthetic company, Bonti, for $195 million.

In March 2019, the company acquired Envy Medical, Inc. As of 2019, Allergan's Botox product had annual sales of nearly $4 billion.

In 2018, along with several other drug manufacturers and distributors, the company was sued by several municipalities and states in the U.S. due to the manufacture of opioids, which have been abused in what has been referred to as the opioid epidemic.

Acquisition by AbbVie Inc. (2019-present)

In June 2019, U.S. pharmaceutical company AbbVie announced it had reached an agreement to acquire Allergan for $63 billion, which would return Allergan to the U.S. for tax purposes. On the announcement of the transaction, Abbvie disclosed that its 2019 net effective tax rate was 9%, but that post the acquisition, the Group's effective tax rate would rise to 13%. The merger is expected to close in 2020.

On May 8, 2020, AbbVie completed its acquisition of Allergan.

Acquisition history

Products 
Allergan acquires, develops, manufactures and markets branded products in four therapeutic areas: medical aesthetics, eye care, central nervous system, and gastroenterology. The company manufactures several pharmaceutical products including Botox (botulinum toxin), Juvederm (injectable filler), CoolSculpting (Cryolipolysis), Alphagan (brimonidine), Vraylar (cariprazine HCI), Linzess (linaclotide), and Ubrelvy (ubrogepant).

See also
 Biotech and pharmaceutical companies in the New York metropolitan area
 The St. Regis Mohawk Tribe and Restasis patent
 Corporate tax inversion
 Ireland as a tax haven

References

External links 

AbbVie
Companies formerly listed on the New York Stock Exchange
Pharmaceutical companies of Ireland
Manufacturing companies based in Dublin (city)
Pharmaceutical companies established in 2015
Irish companies established in 2015
Tax inversions
2020 mergers and acquisitions
Irish subsidiaries of foreign companies